Keiron Cunningham (born 28 October 1976) is a professional rugby league coach and former player. A Great Britain and Wales international representative , he played his entire professional career at St Helens, making nearly 500 appearances for the club between 1994 and 2010 and winning numerous trophies. He has been frequently cited as being among the best players in the Super League history and is widely regarded to be one of St Helens' greatest players of all time.

The youngest of ten siblings, two of his brothers, Eddie Cunningham and Tommy Cunningham, also played for St Helens. Keiron Cunningham was born five months after his brother Eddie won a Rugby League Challenge Cup winner's medal for St Helens against Widnes.

Following his retirement as a player, Cunningham remained at St Helens as an assistant coach, and was head coach of the club between 2015 and 2017. He is currently head of rugby at Leigh Centurions.

Playing career
In 1993, on his 17th birthday, Cunningham signed for his hometown club St Helens from Wigan St Judes. He made his début in the 1994–95 Rugby Football League season, and soon established himself as a world class hooker, renowned for his dynamic running from dummy half and ability to poach tries from short distances. He represented both Great Britain and Wales in international matches, qualifying for Wales because of a Welsh grandfather.

Keiron Cunningham played , and scored a try in St. Helens' 16-25 defeat by Wigan in the 1995–96 Regal Trophy Final during the 1995–96 at Alfred McAlpine Stadium, Huddersfield on Saturday 13 January 1996.

Cunningham played for St Helens at hooker in the 1996 Challenge Cup Final, scoring a try in the second half of the match and helping his team to a 40-32 victory over the Bradford Bulls. At the end of 1996's Super League I, Cunningham was named at hooker in the 1996 Super League Dream Team. Also in 1999 he was the only British player voted into the World XIII.

As Super League V champions, St Helens played against 2000 NRL Premiers, the Brisbane Broncos in the 2001 World Club Challenge.

Over the course of his career, Cunningham rejected offers from the Welsh Rugby Union, England Rugby Union, and from various Australian rugby league clubs, instead choosing to remain with his hometown team. In 2006 Cunningham was named as captain of St. Helens following the persistent injuries and subsequent retirement of Paul Sculthorpe. As 2006 Super League champions, St Helens faced 2006 NRL Premiers the Brisbane Broncos in the 2007 World Club Challenge. Cunningham played from the interchange bench in Saints' 18-14 victory.

He played in the 2009 Super League Grand Final defeat by the Leeds Rhinos at Old Trafford.

In 2010, Cunningham announced that he would be retiring from rugby league following the culmination of 2010's Super League XV. 2010 also marked the last year at St Helens' Knowsley Road ground before moving to a new stadium. It was, in fact, Kieron Cunningham who scored the last try ever at the prestigious ground in his penultimate match. However, despite a memorable 2010 play-offs for Cunningham, there was to be no fairytale ending as his last game ended in defeat against arch rivals the Wigan Warriors in the 2010 Super League Grand Final.

He finished his career with 496 appearances for St Helens, scoring 175 tries.

During his career he won five Super League Championships, seven Challenge Cup Winners Medals and two World Club Challenge Winners medals, was named in the Super League Dream Team on six occasions, and in July 2007 Rugby League World magazine ranked him as the greatest player of the Super League era.

Following a supporters' poll featuring the likes of Tom van Vollenhoven and Alex Murphy, Cunningham was chosen to be cast as a bronze statue outside of Langtree Park. The statue was unveiled on Chalon Way opposite the Glass House pub in March 2010 and was relocated to the stadium following its completion in October 2011.

Coaching career

Following his retirement as a player, Cunningham took up an assistant coaching role in the strength and conditioning department at St Helens. After the sacking of Royce Simmons in 2012 he was appointed assistant head coach of St Helens, working alongside temporary head coach Mike Rush.

On Monday 20 October 2014, Cunningham was appointed as head coach of St Helens. He appointed former Saints teammate Sean Long to assist him for his role. On 10 April 2017 it was announced on the BBC North West Today lunchtime bulletin that Cunningham had been sacked after 24 years associated with the club.

References

External links

!Great Britain Statistics at englandrl.co.uk (statistics currently missing due to not having appeared for both Great Britain, and England)
(archived by web.archive.org) St Helens profile
(archived by web.archive.org) Keiron's Korner
Profile at saints.org.uk

1976 births
Living people
English rugby league players
Great Britain national rugby league team players
Lancashire rugby league team players
Rugby league hookers
Rugby league players from St Helens, Merseyside
St Helens R.F.C. coaches
St Helens R.F.C. players
Wales national rugby league team captains
Wales national rugby league team players